Philip Goff is a British author, philosopher, and Associate Professor at Durham University whose research focuses on philosophy of mind and consciousness. Specifically, it focuses on how consciousness can be part of the scientific worldview. Goff holds that materialism is incoherent and that dualism leads to "complexity, discontinuity and mystery". Instead, he advocates a "third way", a version of Russellian idealist monism that attempts to account for reality's intrinsic nature by positing that consciousness is a fundamental, ubiquitous feature of the physical world. "The basic commitment is that the fundamental constituents of reality—perhaps electrons and quarks—have incredibly simple forms of experience."

Biography

Early life and education

Goff has written that he has been obsessed with the problem of consciousness for as long as he can remember. He declined to be confirmed Catholic at the age of 14 and came to negatively associate philosophical dualism with his religious upbringing. 

As a philosophy undergraduate at Leeds, he felt he had to choose between dualism and materialism, so he became a committed materialist. He passionately debated religious dualists by defending the idea that the mind and the brain are entirely the same thing. But he began to doubt the coherence of this position, because it failed to account for personal experiences whose subjective qualities we know firsthand. This cognitive dissonance finally peaked one evening in a bar when the thrum of vivid sensations clashed with his assumed worldview. "I couldn't deny it anymore. I'd already accepted that if materialism was true, then I was a zombie. But I knew I wasn't a zombie; I was a thinking, feeling human being. I could no longer live in denial of my consciousness." Yet he had to finish his studies, so Goff became a "closet dualist", while continuing to write a dissertation in which he argued that the problem of consciousness was unresolvable. 

Disenchanted with philosophy, he went on to teach English in Poland. 

Later, when he happened across Thomas Nagel’s article "Panpsychism", he discovered a neglected third way, and his interest in academic philosophy was rekindled.

Career
Goff got his PhD at University of Reading under Galen Strawson, one of the few proponents of panpsychism at that time, who was rediscovering Bertrand Russell's and Arthur Eddington’s earlier work on monism. Goff then did postdoctoral work at the Centre for Consciousness at the Australian National University.

He was at The University of Hertfordshire, and King's College London. He was an Associate Professor of Philosophy at Central European University and at the Department of Philosophy, University of Birmingham.

He is currently an Associate Professor at Durham University.

In 2014, Goff attended the Consciousness Cruise off Greenland sponsored by Dimitri Volkov and the Moscow Center for Consciousness Studies. It was a floating conference on a sailboat that featured prominent philosophers of mind such as David Chalmers, Paul Churchland, Patricia Churchland, Andy Clark, Daniel Dennett, Keith Frankish, Nicholas Humphrey, Jesse Prinz, and Derk Pereboom. Goff gave a talk about his developing position on and defense of panpsychism.

Goff and Keith Frankish, a colleague who defends the opposing view of illusionism, started the YouTube channel "Mind Chat” in 2021, interviewing scientists and philosophers of consciousness such as Tim O'Connor, Janet Levin, Christof Koch, Anil Seth, and Helen Yetter-Chappel.

Views

Panpsychism

Galileo inaugurated modern science by dividing the world into the quantitative realm of science and, on the other hand, the qualitative realm of the soul. While this division ushered in the modern scientific era, Goff argues, it likely made it impossible that scientific naturalism could ever account for consciousness without either eliminating its qualitative aspects or falling victim to the liabilities of dualism. Goff was unconvinced by David Chalmers's and Kelvin McQueen's attempt to establish a type of naturalistic dualism based on quantum mechanics. Though Goff thinks the idea deserves more attention, he concluded that even if dualism is compatible with science, we should be wary of it on the grounds that it is less simple than other theories of consciousness.

Goff argued that the qualities of consciousness cannot be captured in the purely quantitative vocabulary of physical sciences. Though the optimistic materialist may hope that further or more detailed quantitative descriptions might someday explain why and how a purely physical brain produces intrinsic personal experiences, Goff used a series of a priori thought experiments to argue that this is likely a false hope. In his book Galileo's Error, Goff used Frank Jackson's Knowledge Argument to show that a purely physical description of the world is not complete. Next, he used Chalmers's Conceivability Argument to argue that materialism cannot possibly be true. Goff concluded, "Materialists who claim both that reality can be exhaustively described in the objective vocabulary of physical science and that there are subjective properties are quite simply contradicting themselves."

Instead Goff supports a "third way", a version of Russellian monism that attempts to account for reality's intrinsic nature by positing that consciousness is a fundamental, ubiquitous feature of the physical world. "The basic commitment is that the fundamental constituents of reality—perhaps electrons and quarks—have incredibly simple forms of experience." Because the claim is that consciousness is fundamental, Goff's view does not provide an account of consciousness that reduces it to something else. He says "it is a prejudice of materialism to suppose that this is obligatory."

Though the idea of electrons having experience is counterintuitive to most people, Goff clarified that most modern panpsychists do not believe that any clump of matter results in complex consciousness. "Most panpsychists will deny that your socks are conscious, while asserting that they are ultimately composed of things that are conscious."

Response
While panpsychism remained a minority view amongst professional philosophers, since the work of Galen Strawson and Goff in the 21st century and their rediscovery of Russell's and Arthur Eddington's 1920's work on consciousness, it's become more widely discussed and debated. Goff has debated panpsychism against thinkers as diverse as physicalist Massimo Pigliucci and idealist Bernardo Kastrup.

In 2021, the Journal of Consciousness Studies published 20 essays by scientists, philosophers, and theologians responding to Goff's work. Goff published a response essay in the same issue.

Environmentalism
Goff sees hope in panpsychism to solve human indifference to the climate crisis. Noting that Naomi Klein blames dualism for our degradation of the environment, Goff speculates that children reared in a panpsychist tradition would be less indifferent to and more protective of the environment.

Politics
Goff calls himself a "vigorous opponent of neoliberalism" and a "huge fan of taxation." He has argued against the libertarian idea that taxation is theft, on the basis that people do not own their pretax income. In 2011 Goff instigated a protest of singer Bono that involved inflating a balloon in the front row of his concert to draw attention to Bono's band U2's financial behaviour, which Goff said amounted to Bono being a "tax rogue". Goff has written that Bono's behaviour, as revealed in the Paradise Papers, is part of a general trend of the wealthy moving their money to tax havens at developing countries' expense (citing Christian Aid's estimate that this amounts to $160 billion annually).

Religion
Goff calls himself a "practicing agnostic," writing that Christianity might not be true but that he finds its practice enriching.

Publications
Goff has published over 46 academic papers, 10 book reviews, guest edited an issue of Philosophy Now and written over 35 articles in the popular press in outlets such as The Guardian, The Times Literary Supplement. He has appeared in 70 podcasts and various debates. In 2021, the Journal of Consciousness Studies featured Goff's work as the topic of 20 essays by scientists, philosophers, and theologians. Goff responded to their essays in the same journal.

Personal life
Goff plays in a rock band, writing on his website that "we still gig occasionally."

Books
 Consciousness and Fundamental Reality (2017) 
 Galileo's Error: Foundations for a New Science of Consciousness (2020)

References

External links
 
 Goff's author page at The Guardian
 Goff's author page at Scientific American
 

20th-century British philosophers
21st-century British philosophers
Academics of Durham University
Living people
Philosophers of mind
Year of birth missing (living people)